Old Woodhouselee Castle was a 16th-century tower house, about  north east of Penicuik, Midlothian, Scotland, south of the river North Esk near a dismantled railway track.

History
It has been suggested that the castle was built by Oliver Sinclair in the first half of the 16th century. Historic Environment Scotland, however, only date it to the 16th or early 17th century. 
The property belonged to the Hamiltons of Bothwellheugh.  It is reported that the Regent Moray turned Lady Hamilton and her young child out of the property naked; the child died and Lady Hamilton went mad.  What is known is that her husband James Hamilton of Bothwellhaugh and Woodhouselee assassinated the Regent Moray at Linlithgow in 1570.
In the late 17th century the castle was demolished and used for the building of Woodhouselee, which has also since disappeared.

Structure
The castle was on a high rock. Only three cellars and a ruined wing remain of an L-plan tower.
A small structure on the site is believed to have been a kitchen.

Tradition
The ghost of Lady Hamilton, dressed in white, and searching for her baby, is said to haunt the ruins.

See also
Castles in Great Britain and Ireland
List of castles in Scotland

References

Castles in Midlothian